Axel Camillo Eitzen may refer to:

 Axel Camillo Eitzen (1851–1937), Norwegian ship-owner
 Axel Camillo Eitzen (1883–1968), Norwegian ship-owner